Cameron Van Hoy (born May 21, 1985) is an American director, producer and writer. He first came to attention as the protagonist of Pups (1999), a critically acclaimed indie crime drama he starred in as a teen opposite Burt Reynolds. He has gone on to produce multiple films that have been loved by critics and audiences the world over. Now Van Hoy has moved into the director's chair after his debut feature Flinch, the neo-noir crime thriller about a young hitman who falls for the witness to a murder he commits.

Early life
Van Hoy began acting professionally as a teen, starring in such films as Pups opposite Burt Reynolds and in the hit animated series Hey Arnold. He attended Fiorello H. LaGuardia High School in New York City, the high school for the performing arts, where he studied as a drama major. Van Hoy began working behind the camera as a writer and producer in Los Angeles, further honing his skills as a lifetime member at the Actors Studio. He was brought into the studio by his mentor Martin Landau after starring in and producing a film with the actor titled David and Fatima. Van Hoy continued writing and producing before moving into the director's chair.

Career
Van Hoy garnered considerable critical acclaim when he starred alongside Mischa Barton and Burt Reynolds in the indie crime drama, Pups written and directed by Ash. Van Hoy portrays Stevie, a frustrated adolescent that decides to stage a bank heist after discovering a gun in the family home. Along with Barton, film critic Roger Ebert called their work in the film "two of the most natural and freed performances I have seen by actors of any age."
 
Van Hoy followed up his breakout role on Pups with guest appearances on the TV series, Hey Arnold!. He returned to the screen in 2008 after a 6-year absence, starring in David & Fatima, the first film Van Hoy produced. The drama is an updated retelling of Shakespeare's Romeo & Juliet but based on the love between an Israeli man and a Palestinian woman. In 2009, he made several guest appearances as Eddie Alvarez in the TV series, Crash. He later appeared in the independent drama, Love Hurts (2009). Van Hoy also wrote and starred in Treasure of the Black Jaguar (2010), the film went on the win the distribution award at the Raindance Film Festival in London.

In 2012, Van Hoy was reunited with his former Pups on-screen girlfriend and co-star, Mischa Barton. The pair featured in the music video for Noel Gallagher's Everybody's on the Run. Between this time Van Hoy produced two feature films, Sharkproof, starring Jon Lovitz, and Tooken, a spoof of the popular Taken franchise. 

Van Hoy currently works as the Executive Director at Ardor Pictures where he produces, and directs films such as the SXSW darling Tragedy Girls (2017) and Flinch (2021) a crime thriller that has gained a loyal fan base online. Ardor Pictures also produces and creates commercials, music videos, and more.

Filmography

Reviews 

"Flinch is a crime thriller that channels the greats from the past while simultaneously forging its own path."  -Good Bad Flicks 

"Van Hoy displays the kind of patience, spatial awareness, and narrative control of someone with more feature experience, resulting in a crime thriller with enough surprise to keep you locked in." - Douglas Davidson, Elements of Madness 

"Van Hoy never relents, refusing to let viewers get comfortable and keeps them on the edge of their seats." - Kyle Bain, Film Threat

"Tragedy Girls is a sharp piece of genre work." - Haleigh Foutch, Collider

References

External links

1985 births
Living people
20th-century American male actors
21st-century American male actors
Fiorello H. LaGuardia High School alumni
Male actors from California
Film producers from New York (state)
American male child actors
American male film actors
American male television actors
American male voice actors
American male stage actors
Place of birth missing (living people)
American people of Dutch descent
American people of Italian descent